Divača railway station is a significant railway station in Divača, Slovenia. It was opened in 1857, and is located close to the Italian border, on the main railway line between Ljubljana, Slovenia and Trieste, Italy.

External links 

Railway stations in Slovenia
Railway stations opened in 1857
1857 establishments in the Austrian Empire